Hokanson is a surname. Notable people with the surname include:

Daniel R. Hokanson (born 1963), United States Army officer 
Leonard Hokanson (1931–2003), American pianist
Randolph Hokanson (1915–2018), American pianist 
Shirley A. Hokanson (born 1936), American politician and social worker

See also
Hoganson